Mirkin or Mirkina (feminine form in Slavic countries) is the surname of the following people:
 Boris Mirkin-Getzevich (1892–1955), Russian jurist
 Chad Mirkin (born 1963), American chemist
 David Mirkin (born 1955), American feature film and television director, writer and producer
 Gabe Mirkin (born 1935), American physician and journalist on sports medicine, nutrition, and health
 Harris G. Mirkin (1936-2013), American political science professor

See also
Merkin